Daniel Dromm (born November 27, 1955) is an American politician who served in the New York City Council from the 25th district from 2010 to 2021. He is a Democrat. The district includes East Elmhurst, Elmhurst and Jackson Heights in Queens.

Life and career
Dromm was born in Rego Park, but his family moved to Oyster Bay on Long Island when he was 5, and later to Manhasset when he was 9. He attended Catholic schools. Dromm graduated from Marist College and earned his master's degree at City College.

A resident of Jackson Heights, Dromm began his first career as a public school teacher in 1984 at P.S. 199 in Sunnyside. As an educator, he promoted teaching acceptance of LGBT individuals through the Rainbow Curriculum and publicly came out in 1992. Heavily involved in the Queens County Democratic Party, he served as Democratic District Leader in the 39th assembly district.

He is one of the first two openly gay City Council members from outside Manhattan.

Dromm was featured prominently in the 2015 Frederick Wiseman documentary In Jackson Heights.

New York City Council
As a Democrat, he was elected to the City Council in 2009, representing the 25th district in Queens. Dromm defeated Councilwoman Helen Sears by 10 points, 49% to 39%, in the Democratic primary.  Dromm was reelected in 2013 and served as Chairperson of the Council's influential Committee on Education from 2014 to 2017.

In 2014, Dromm co-sponsored New York City Council bill Intro 253 to create the city's first government-issued photo identification card, later named "IDNYC."  The bill was passed overwhelmingly by the Council and signed into law by Mayor Bill de Blasio.  IDNYC aides the homeless, youth, the elderly, undocumented immigrants, the formerly incarcerated and others who may have difficulty obtaining other government-issued ID.  IDNYC is recognized ID for interacting with NYPD and allows card holders to gain access to all City buildings that provide services to the public.  It is an accepted form of identification for accessing numerous City programs and services such as the Brooklyn Public Library, the Queens Library and New York City Public Library, the three library systems serving the City of New York.  Several NYC cultural institutions grant cardholders free one-year memberships; these institutions include a number of museums, zoos, concert halls, and botanical gardens.

In 2015, Dromm said that he is against a bill sponsored by New York City Council Member David Greenfield to allow non-public schools (including religious and charter schools) to request that safety agents from the New York Police Department be posted inside the schools and be funded by the Board of Education.  Dromm insists that more NYPD police officers or safety agents in the schools will not solve the problem of increasing situations of hate crimes citywide and be counterproductive.

On December 19, 2017, the New York City Council unanimously passed Dromm's resolution establishing January 30 annually as Fred T. Korematsu Day of Civil Liberties and the Constitution in honor of the late civil rights activist who objected to the internment of Japanese Americans during World War II.

In January 2018, Dromm was unanimously elected to serve as the chairperson of the NYC Council Committee on Finance.

See also
 LGBT culture in New York City
 List of LGBT people from New York City

References

External links
 Official NYC Council Website
 Campaign website 

Schoolteachers from New York (state)
Gay politicians
Living people
New York (state) Democrats
New York City Council members
People from Jackson Heights, Queens
Marist College alumni
City College of New York alumni
American LGBT city council members
LGBT people from New York (state)
21st-century American politicians
Educators from New York City
People from Oyster Bay (town), New York
People from Manhasset, New York
1955 births
21st-century LGBT people